Flacourtia indica (syn. Flacourtia ramontchi), known commonly as ramontchi, governor's plum, Madagascar plum and Indian plum, is a species of flowering plant native to much of Africa and tropical and temperate parts of Asia. F. indica and F. ramontchi are sometimes treated as separate species.

Description
This is a bushy shrub or tree with a spiny trunk and branches. The drooping branches bear oval leaves. The seeds are dispersed by birds.
This tree has thorns similar to that of a lime or lemon tree. If in contact with the thorns, it leaves a nasty stinging pain.

Uses
The ramontchi fruit itself is about an inch thick and red ripening purple. It is very fleshy and has 6 to 10 seeds in layered carpels. The pulp is yellow or white and sweet with an acidic tang. It is eaten raw or made into jelly or jam. It can be fermented to make wine.

The leaves and roots are used in herbal medicine for treatment of snakebite. The bark is believed to be effective for arthritis. Most parts of the plant are used for cough, pneumonia, and bacterial throat infection. It has also been used for diarrhea.

The tree is planted as a living fence; it was one of the species used for the Indian Inland Customs Line. The wood is used for firewood and small wooden tools such as plow handles.

Cultivation
The plant is known as an occasionally invasive introduced species in some areas. It has been cultivated in Florida in the United States and today it occurs as a weed in some parts of the state.

References

External links
USDA Plants Profile
Palm Beach County Cooperative Extension Service, Florida

Fruits originating in Africa
indica
Taxa named by Nicolaas Laurens Burman